Mystic Miner Ski Resort is a defunct ski resort, in the Black Hills, just outside Lead, South Dakota, in the United States. Deer Mountain has a vertical drop of 699 feet. The summit of Deer Mountain is at 6,850 feet.

Ski area description 
44 runs
3 lifts 
Terrain park
Snowmaking
Ski and snowboard rental

External links 
Deer Mountain's website

References

Black Hills
Buildings and structures in Lawrence County, South Dakota
Ski areas and resorts in South Dakota
Tourist attractions in Lawrence County, South Dakota